Genesis 1:2 is the second verse of the Genesis creation narrative. It is a part of the Torah portion Bereshit.

Hebrew
Masoretic Text

Transliteration:
Wəhā’āreṣ hāyəṯāh ṯōhû wāḇōhû wəḥōšeḵ ‘al-pənê ṯəhôm wərûaḥ ’ĕlōhîm məraḥep̱eṯ ‘al-pənê hammāyim.

 Wəhā’āreṣ: "and the earth"
 hāyəṯāh: "was", pa'al construction past tense third person feminine singular
 tohu wabohu: difficult to translate, but often rendered as "formless and void"
 wəḥōšeḵ: "and darkness
 ‘al-pənê: "[was] over (or covered) [the] face", pənê being a plural construct state of the Hebrew word for face
 ṯəhôm: a mythological or cosmological concept often translated as "the Deep"
 wərûaḥ: "and [the] ruah", a difficult term translated as "spirit" or "wind"
 ĕlōhîm: the generic Hebrew term for God or gods, distinct from Yahweh, the name of the god of Israel
 məraḥep̱eṯ: often translated as "hovered/was hovering" The word is ריחף(rikhef) in pi'el participle form prefixed with one letter prefix "m-".
 ‘al-pənê hammāyim: "over the face of the waters"

Translation
Wəhā’āreṣ: "and the earth"
 hāyəṯāh: "was", pa'al construction past tense third person feminine singular
 tohu wabohu: difficult to translate, but often rendered as "formless and void"
 wəḥōšeḵ: "and darkness
 ‘al-pənê: "[was] over (or covered) [the] face", pənê being a plural construct state of the Hebrew word for face
 ṯəhôm: a mythological or cosmological concept often translated as "the Deep"
 wərûaḥ: "and [the] ruah", a difficult term translated as "spirit" or "wind"
 ĕlōhîm: the generic Hebrew term for God or gods, distinct from Yahweh, the name of the god of Israel
 məraḥep̱eṯ: often translated as "hovered/was hovering" The word is ריחף(rikhef) in pi'el participle form prefixed with one letter prefix "m-".
 ‘al-pənê''': see above
 hammāyim: "the waters"Tohu wabohu is commonly translated as "formless and empty", and denotes the absence of some abstract quality such as purpose or worth. Tohu by itself means desert, desert-like, empty, uninhabited (see Jeremiah 4:23 and Isaiah 34:11), so that "Tohu wabohu" signifies that the earth was empty of life, whether plant, animal, or human. "Tehôm" was the cosmic ocean both above and below the earth. Ruah means "wind"; the wind blows (rather than hovers) ‘al-pənê hammāyim, over the face of the waters of Tehom.

 Analysis 

Genesis 1:2 presents an initial condition of creation - namely, that it is tohu wa-bohu, formless and void. This serves to introduce the rest of the chapter, which describes a process of forming and filling. That is, on the first three days the heavens, the sky and the land is formed, and they are filled on days four to six by luminaries, birds and fish, and animals and man respectively.

Before God begins to create, the world is : the word  by itself means "emptiness, futility"; it is used to describe the desert wilderness.  has no known meaning and was apparently coined to rhyme with and reinforce . It appears again in Jeremiah 4:23, where Jeremiah warns Israel that rebellion against God will lead to the return of darkness and chaos, "as if the earth had been ‘uncreated’." , chaos, is the condition that , ordering, remedies.

In the Enûma Eliš, the Deep is personified as the goddess Tiamat, the enemy of Marduk; here it is the formless body of primeval water surrounding the habitable world, later to be released during the Deluge, when "all the fountains of the great deep burst forth" from the waters beneath the earth and from the "windows" of the sky. William Dumbrell notes that the reference to the "deep" in this verse "alludes to the detail of the ancient Near Eastern cosmologies" in which "a general threat to order comes from the unruly and chaotic sea, which is finally tamed by a warrior god." Dumbrell goes on to suggest that Genesis 1:2 "reflects something of the chaos/order struggle characteristic of ancient cosmologies".

The "Spirit of God" hovering over the waters in some translations of Genesis 1:2 comes from the Hebrew phrase , which has alternately been interpreted as a "great wind". Victor P. Hamilton decides, somewhat tentatively, for "spirit of God" but notes that this does not necessarily refer to the "Holy Spirit" of Christian theology.Rûach has the meanings "wind, spirit, breath," and  can mean "great" as well as "god". The  which moves over the Deep may therefore mean the "wind/breath of God" (the storm-wind is God's breath in Psalms 18:15 and elsewhere, and the wind of God returns in the Flood story as the means by which God restores the earth), or God's "spirit", a concept which is somewhat vague in the Hebrew bible, or simply a great storm-wind.

See also

 Book of Genesis
 Genesis 1:1
 Tohu wa-bohu Genesis 1:3

References

Citations

Bibliography

Further reading
 Jewish Publication Society. The Torah: The Five Books of Moses'' (3rd ed). Philadelphia: 1999.
 Darshan, Guy, “Ruaḥ ’Elohim in Genesis 1:2 in Light of Phoenician Cosmogonies: A Tradition’s History,” Journal of Northwest Semitic Languages 45,2 (2019), 51–78.

External links
 "Genesis 1:2." Online Parallel Bible.

Hebrew Bible verses
Genesis 1:2